Omkar Singh Yadav is an Indian politician and a member of the Sixteenth Legislative Assembly of Uttar Pradesh in India. He represents the Sahaswan constituency of Uttar Pradesh and is a member of the Samajwadi Party political party.

Early life and  education 
Omkar Singh Yadav was born in Budaun district . He attended the University of Lucknow and completed Bachelor of Laws degree.

Political career 
Omkar Singh Yadav has been a MLA for five terms. He represented the Sahaswan constituency and is a member of the Samajwadi Party political party.

Posts held

See also 
 Sahaswan (Assembly constituency)
 Sixteenth Legislative Assembly of Uttar Pradesh
 Uttar Pradesh Legislative Assembly

References 

Samajwadi Party politicians
Uttar Pradesh MLAs 1991–1993
Uttar Pradesh MLAs 2002–2007
Uttar Pradesh MLAs 2012–2017
Uttar Pradesh MLAs 2017–2022
People from Budaun district
1951 births
Living people